Colin Hillman (b. 4 May 1961; d. 2 July 2009) was a former Welsh rugby coach with the Wales National Sevens team.

Hillman was also Spanish National Sevens Rugby coach and developer of rugby in Spain. Hillman also remained as Director of Rugby at Bridgend RFC and was still a WRU Technical Advisor to the Wales Sevens team at the time of his death.

During his senior playing career, Hillman was hooker for Bridgend RFC but also played for the Barbarians, Wales Sevens, Swansea RFC, South Wales Police RFC, Bridgend Sports and Merthyr rugby clubs. Alongside his role with Wales 7s, Colin was also an integral part of the Samurai rugby 7s brand becoming one of the most recognisable in the world of rugby today via both coaching and managing.

Senior Playing Career

During his senior playing career, Hillman was hooker for Bridgend RFC but also played for the Barbarians, Wales Sevens,  Swansea RFC, South Wales Police RFC, Bridgend Sports and Merthyr rugby clubs. Colin Hillman was a part of rugby history when he played for the Wales Youth team which defeated South Africa Youth 30 - 25 at the Newlands ground, Cape Town on May 31, 1980, in a curtain raiser match before the British and Irish Lions played the Springboks. Two of his teammates that day included future internationals Bleddyn Bowen and Ray Giles. The game remains as the only Welsh international win again a South African international team on South African soil.

Coaching career

After his playing days, Hillman turned to coaching, significantly at Nantymoel RFC and became Director of Rugby at the Bridgend Ravens whilst also featuring on the international stage as the Wales Sevens National Team Coach. He represented the jerseys to the Wales squad which then headed for Dubai and won the Rugby World Cup for the first time in 2009. His reputation around the world of rugby was emphasised when he was asked to help develop and coach the Spanish National Sevens Rugby Team. Alongside his role with Wales 7s, Colin was also an integral part of the Samurai rugby 7s brand becoming one of the most recognisable in the world of rugby today via both coaching and managing

Police career

Away from rugby, Hillman worked as a South Wales Police officer and served for a significant part of his career as a South Wales Police Armed Response Officer.

Death

Hillman died on 2 July 2009 after a two-year-long battle with pancreatic cancer. Colin is survived by his wife Janine and two sons, Ben and Matthew.

Welsh rugby union coaches
Welsh rugby union players
Bridgend RFC players
Swansea RFC players
1961 births
2009 deaths